Dongtan may refer to:

 Dongtan, Shanghai, China
 Dongtan, Hwaseong, South Korea
Đồng Tân, Hiệp Hòa District, Bắc Giang Province, Vietnam

See also
 Dontan